Robert Allan Genge (December 20, 1889 – September 20, 1937) was a Canadian professional ice hockey player. As a defenceman, he played with the Victoria Aristocrats and briefly the Spokane Canaries of the Pacific Coast Hockey Association from 1912 to 1921. Large in stature, Genge was known as a "dominating two-way player". He died from sepsis at Vancouver in 1937, aged 47.

References

External links
Statistics

1889 births
1937 deaths
Ice hockey people from Ontario
Spokane Canaries players
Victoria Aristocrats players
Canadian ice hockey defencemen